Huntershill Village is located opposite Huntershill House at the top of Crowhill Road in Bishopbriggs, East Dunbartonshire, Scotland. Over forty local businesses operate from the location. It was historically part of the Huntershill Estate, former residence of the political reformer Thomas Muir. It is also the former site of the Huntershill mining and freestone quarry.

A Cairn and Martyrs Gate dedicated to Muir and fellow martyrs from England and Scotland were erected at Huntershill Village by John SL Watson, and partly funded by the East Dunbartonshire Council.

Visitor facilities includes the Thomas Muir Coffee Shop, art gallery & classes, picture framer, pet and aquatic and garden/gift centre. On 3 September 2009 at 10am, East Dunbartonshire's Provost Eric Gotts formally opened the Bishopbriggs Farmers Market which is held on the first Saturday of every month.

External links

 Huntershill Village website
 https://twitter.com/huntershillafc?lang=en

Football

In 2017, a new team in Huntershill AFC were born under founders, Lewis Macdonald and Andrew Milne.

The team is managed by the highly sought after Macdonald and co founder Milne is a key player in the squad.

Villages in East Dunbartonshire
Bishopbriggs